The 3rd Daily Record Trophy was a motor race, run to Formula One rules, held on 6 August 1955 at Charterhall Circuit, Berwickshire. The race was run over two heats of 15 laps and a final of 20 laps, and was won by British driver Bob Gerard in a Maserati 250F. Horace Gould and Louis Rosier were second and third, also in 250Fs. Gerard and Rosier shared fastest lap.

This was the only occasion on which the Daily Record Trophy was run under Formula 1 rules, the previous races in 1953 and 1954 being Formula Libre events. It was also the last occurrence of the event.

Results

Heats

Final

References 

Daily Record
Daily Record
Daily record